For details on climate change in North America, please see:
 Climate change in Canada
 Climate change in the Caribbean
 Climate change in Greenland
 Climate change in Grenada
 Climate change in Guatemala
 Climate change in Honduras
 Climate change in Mexico
 Climate change in the United States

For details on climate change in South America, please see:

 Climate change in Argentina
 Climate change in Brazil
 Climate of Chile
 Climate change in Colombia
 Climate change in Ecuador
 Climate change in Guyana
 Climate change in Paraguay
 Climate change in Peru
 Climate change in Suriname
 Climate change in Uruguay
 Climate change in Venezuela

Climate change by continent
Climate of North America
Environment of North America
Climate of South America
Environment of South America